John Dennis McCrate (October 1, 1802 – September 11, 1879) was a United States representative from Maine.  He was born in Wiscasset, Massachusetts (now in Maine) on October 1, 1802. McCrate graduated from Bowdoin College in 1819. He studied law, was admitted to the bar and practiced in Damariscotta and in Wiscasset.

McCrate was elected a member of the Maine House of Representatives. McCrate was elected as a Democrat to the Twenty-ninth Congress (March 4, 1845 – March 3, 1847). He resumed the practice of law in Wiscasset before moving to Boston, Massachusetts, continuing the practice of his profession until 1852 when he moved to Sutton, Massachusetts and engaged in agricultural pursuits.

Death and burial
McCrate died in Sutton, Massachusetts on September 11, 1879, and was interred in Ancient Cemetery in Wiscasset.

References

1802 births
1879 deaths
Bowdoin College alumni
People from Wiscasset, Maine
Maine lawyers
Massachusetts lawyers
People from Damariscotta, Maine
Democratic Party members of the United States House of Representatives from Maine
19th-century American politicians
19th-century American lawyers
People from Sutton, Massachusetts